Warawarani (Aymara warawara star, -ni a suffix to indicate ownership, "the one with a star", Hispanicized spelling Buarahuarani) is a mountain in the Andes of southern Peru, about  high. It lies in the Tacna Region, Tacna Province, Palca District, and in the Tarata Province, Tarata District. The mountain is situated south of Juqhuri and northeast of  Wayna Pawqarani (Huaynapaucarani). West of Warawarani there are two lower mountains named Laram Qullu (Aymara for "blue mountain", Hispanicized Laramcollo) and Wila Qullu (Aymara for "red mountain", Vilacollo)

References

Mountains of Peru
Mountains of Tacna Region